Ebodina simplex is a species of moth of the family Tortricidae. It is found in the Philippines (Luzon), Vietnam and Papua New Guinea.

References

Moths described in 1968
Polyorthini